Achilles Tatius (Greek: Ἀχιλλεὺς Τάτιος, Achilleus Tatios) of Alexandria was a Roman-era Greek writer of the 2nd century AD whose fame is attached to his only surviving work, the ancient Greek novel, or romance, The Adventures of Leucippe and Clitophon.

Life and minor works
Eustathius of Thessalonica (in his commentary on Homer's Odyssey 14.350), the Suda, Photius, in his  Bibliotheca (cod. 87), and the manuscript tradition all affirm he lived and wrote in Alexandria. The papyrus,  and linguistic  evidence demonstrate he flourished early in the 2nd century AD. 
Suda preserves a tradition that "He became at last a Christian and a bishop." There are literary parallels  between Leucippe and Clitophon  and the Christian Acts of Andrew, a roughly contemporary  composition.
     
The Suda also ascribes to the author a work on the sphere (in Greek ), a fragment of which, professing to be an introduction to the Phaenomena of Aratus, may still be extant (in Greek ).  This, however, may be the work of another Achilles Tatius, who lived in the 3rd century.  This work is referred to by Firmicus Maternus, who about 336 speaks of the prudentissimus Achilles in his Matheseos libri (Math. iv. 10). The fragment was first published in 1567, then in the Uranologion of the Jesuit scholar Denis Pétau, with a Latin translation in 1630. The same source also mentions a work of Achilles Tatius on etymology, and another entitled Miscellaneous Histories.

Notes

References
James N. O'Sullivan, A Lexicon to Achilles Tatius, Berlin-New York (De Gruyter) 1980
 Del Corno, Dario; Letteratura greca (1988)

External links

 "Achilleus Statios" in the Suda
 Photius, Bibliotheca, J.H. Freese (translator) (1920)
 Smith, William; Dictionary of Greek and Roman Biography and Mythology, "Achilles Tatius", Boston, (1867)
Leucippe and Clitophon, complete Greek text
Leucippe and Clitophon, full English translation

Ancient Greek novelists
Egyptian novelists
Greek erotica writers
Roman-era Alexandrians
Year of birth unknown
Year of death unknown
2nd-century novelists
2nd-century Egyptian people